Sir Thomas Aubrey Lawies Brocklebank, 4th Baronet (23 October 1899 – 15 September 1953) was the 4th baronet of the Brocklebank baronets, a businessman and a first-class cricketer for Cambridge University in two matches in 1919.

He was the eldest son of Sir Aubrey Brocklebank, 3rd Baronet and was educated at Eton and Trinity College, Cambridge. He was unmarried and was succeeded in the baronetcy by his brother John, also a first-class cricketer for Cambridge University.

References

See also
Brocklebank (surname)

1899 births
1953 deaths
People educated at Eton College
Alumni of Trinity College, Cambridge
English cricketers
Cambridge University cricketers
Baronets in the Baronetage of the United Kingdom
Cheshire cricketers